Eusarca packardaria, or Packard's eusarca, is a species of geometrid moth in the family Geometridae. It is found in North America.

The MONA or Hodges number for Eusarca packardaria is 6936.

References

Further reading

External links

 

Ourapterygini
Articles created by Qbugbot
Moths described in 1940